is a Prefectural Natural Park in south-central Chiba Prefecture, Japan. The park spans the municipalities of Futtsu and Kimitsu. In 1956 the habitat the mountain provides for the Japanese macaque was designated a Natural Monument.

See also
 National Parks of Japan
 Monuments of Japan

References

External links
  Map of Takagoyama Prefectural Natural Park

Parks and gardens in Chiba Prefecture
Protected areas established in 1935
1935 establishments in Japan
Natural monuments of Japan